Jolene Van Vugt (born September 17, 1980) is a Canadian motocross rider. She is the first CMRC Women's Canadian Motocross National Champion, first woman to backflip a full-sized dirt bike, holder of multiple Guinness World Records, and co-star of many motocross/stunt videos. She also appeared in the television show Nitro Circus.

Biography
Born in London, Ontario to Dutch immigrant parents Bill and Tina Van Vugt, the youngest of three children, Van Vugt grew up heavily influenced by her father, a young at heart avid motocross racer, while her mother wanted her to become a figure skater or ballerina. At the age of 11, Van Vugt convinced her father to buy her a dirt bike, after much debate about her commitment to her ever-changing hobbies.

At the age of 14, Van Vugt was given the ultimatum to either practice, race and take motocross seriously or give it up for good. Van Vugt chose to focus full-time on motocross and quickly rose to the top ranks of Canadian women's motocross. Earning multiple Ontario Provincial Championships, a 9th place overall in the WMA (Women's Motocross Association), earning her lifetime number 63. She also competed in many prestigious motocross events, such as the Loretta Lynn's Amateur National and the TransCan Canadian Amateur Grand National Championship.

From 2006, Van Vugt has been part of the television show Nitro Circus, originally a mini-series broadcast by Fuel TV that became a full series broadcast by MTV in 2009. In 2012, she performed Catwoman's driving stunts in the film The Dark Knight Rises.

In September 2015, Van Vugt was seriously injured when attempting to do a ramp jump using a slingshot (a device used to propel bikes to high speeds in a short distance). The injuries required multiple reconstructive surgeries to her face and were expected to take months of recovery before she could perform again.

Career highlights
2003
CMRC Ladies Ontario Provincial Champion
TransCan Canadian Grand National Championship, Walton Raceway, Ladies 2nd
CMX Canadian National Championship, Ladies 2nd
WML Pro National Binghamton, N.Y. Round 5, 16th

2004
CMRC Ladies Ontario Provincial Champion
TransCan Canadian Grand National Championship, Walton Raceway, Ladies 2nd
CMX Ladies Canadian National Champion
WMA Pro National Monster Mtn. AL. Round 4, 7th
WMA Pro National Cohcoton, N.Y. Round 5, 7th
WMA Pro National Steel City, PA. Round 6, 7th
WMA Pro National Series 9th (Earning lifetime National #)

2005
First woman to backflip a full-sized dirtbike, ramp to dirt
TransCan Canadian Grand National Championship, Walton Raceway, Ladies 2nd
CMRC Ladies Ontario Provincial, 3rd
WMA Pro National Glen Helen, CA. Round 1, 20th
WMA Pro National Hangtown, CA. Round 2, 31st
WMA Pro National ThunderValley, CO. Round 3, 15th
WMA Pro National Washogual, WA. Round 4, 8th
WMA Pro National Steel City, PA. Round 5, 11th
WMA Pro National Series 16th

2006
CMRC Women's Canadian National Champion
Setting a female backflip distance record, 60 ft ramp to dirt
WMA Pro National Glen Helen, CA. Round 1, 16th
WMA Pro National Hangtown, CA. Round 2, 18th
Out for the remaining season due to surgery

2007
CMRC Women's Canadian National Championship, 2nd
TransCan Canadian Grand National Championship, Walton Raceway, Ladies Champion
First woman to backflip a dirt bike into Grand Canyon
WMA Pro National Budds Creek, MD. Round 3, 15th
WMA Pro National Steel City, PA. Round 6, 13th

2008
Guinness World Record for first woman to backflip a dirt bike
Guinness World Record for longest female backflip
CMRC Women's Canadian National Championship, 3rd
WMA Pro National Southwick, MA. Round 5, 11th
TransCan Canadian Grand National Championship, Walton Raceway, Ladies Champion
First woman to jump at MOD FMX show in Austria

2010
First woman to backflip a full-sized dirt bike, ramp to ramp
Nitro Circus Live, Brisbane, Australia, May 7

Filmography

Television
Rob Dyrdek's Fantasy Factory (1 episode, 2009)
Nitro Circus (2009)
Nitro Circus Live (2011–2014)
Ridiculousness (1 episode, 2016)
Z Nation (1 episode, 2016)
Jay Leno's Garage (1 episode, 2020)
Barry (3 episodes, 2022)

Films
Jackass Presents: Mat Hoffman's Tribute to Evel Knievel (2008)
Nitro Circus: The Movie (2012)
Sonic the Hedgehog (2020)

References

External links
Van Vugt's official website

1980 births
Living people
Sportspeople from London, Ontario
Canadian sportswomen
Canadian stunt performers
Canadian people of Dutch descent
Canadian motocross riders
Female motorcycle racers
Motorcycle stunt performers
Women stunt performers
Freestyle motocross riders